"Welcome to Korea" was a 2-episode story arc, the 73rd and 74th episodes of the M*A*S*H television series, and first two episodes of the fourth season of the series. First aired on September 12, 1975, the series' first 60 minute episode (double the normal time) was most notable for its off-screen departure of the character of Captain Trapper John McIntyre (played by Wayne Rogers), and his replacement by the freshly drafted Captain B.J. Hunnicutt (played by Mike Farrell).

"Welcome to Korea" features the first depiction of the 4077th MASH following the death of former unit commander Lieutenant Colonel Henry Blake (played by McLean Stevenson), and with Major Frank Burns (played by Larry Linville) in charge. Another change of command is previewed, in the form of a short appearance by Harry Morgan as Colonel Sherman T. Potter; he would be fully introduced in the following episode, "Change of Command".

The episode, which was written by Everett Greenbaum, Jim Fritzell, and series creator Larry Gelbart and directed by Gene Reynolds, won two Emmy awards in 1976: "Outstanding Directing in a Comedy Series" for Reynolds, and "Outstanding Achievement in Film Editing for Entertainment Programming in a Comedy Series". After the joint departures of Stevenson and Rogers, one third of the original cast, after the series' third season, there was a great deal of uncertainty about the direction and future for the series; "Welcome to Korea" was notable for beginning a generalized move for the series away from a sitcom to a dramedy.

Plot synopsis
Hawkeye Pierce returns to the 4077th after a week's R&R in Tokyo, only to find that Trapper John McIntyre has been discharged from the Army and is on his way back to the US. Trapper had left camp shortly before Hawkeye's return, without leaving him a goodbye note.

Frank Burns (now commanding officer in the wake of Henry Blake's death) and Margaret Houlihan anticipate the chance to mold Trapper's replacement, Captain B.J. Hunnicutt, into their version of the ideal Army officer. After Frank denies Hawkeye's request to leave camp and find Trapper in order to say goodbye, Radar O'Reilly gets permission to pick up B.J. at the airfield in Kimpo, Trapper's first stop on his way home. Ignoring Frank's refusal to allow him to leave camp, Hawkeye pressures Radar into taking him along.

At Kimpo Airfield, Hawkeye becomes disheartened over the fact that he has missed Trapper by ten minutes. Radar finds B.J. and introduces the two surgeons to one another. When they get ready to leave, though, they find that their jeep has been stolen. After a few drinks and an uneasy encounter with a colonel in the officers' club, they steal a general's jeep and start back toward the 4077th.

During the drive, the three stop upon finding a pair of Korean girls probing a pasture with long poles to check for land mines, while their father watches from the edge. Hawkeye berates the man for putting his daughters in danger just before one of them triggers a mine and is wounded. Radar rushes into the field to bring her out, ignoring shouts to stop from Hawkeye and B.J., and leads her sister to safety as well.

After the three drop the family off at a local hospital, the jeep blows a tire. While changing it, they find themselves being shot at by guerrillas, but escape with no damage beyond a few bullet holes in the vehicle. They encounter an Army patrol that comes under attack by enemy artillery, leaving several wounded. As Hawkeye and B.J. work to help the casualties, B.J. finds one man dead and vomits upon seeing the extent of his wounds.

Their last stop is at Rosie's Bar, just outside camp, where Hawkeye buys B.J. a drink to help settle his nerves as Radar enjoys his usual grape Nehi. Hawkeye describes the doctors' work at the camp and its general atmosphere, only for two other customers to start fighting and smash the trio's table. Some time later, a drunken Hawkeye and B.J. stumble out of the bar and Radar drives them to camp. Frank and Margaret are appalled at their disheveled appearance and B.J.'s greeting to Frank: "What say you, Ferret-Face?" Hawkeye and B.J. collapse in gales of hysterical laughter. Later, Frank is arrested for driving the jeep that the three stole from the airfield.

The episode ends with a roll call of the series' main cast and the arrival of Colonel Sherman Potter, newly assigned as the 4077th's commanding officer. Radar, shirtless and sunbathing, is greatly embarrassed once he realizes that Potter is standing right in front of him, having told Potter to "Stick that horn in your ear!" after Potter blows the jeep's horn to get Radar's attention.

References

External links

 
 

1975 American television episodes
M*A*S*H (season 4) episodes
Emmy Award-winning episodes